Becky Judd is an American former slalom canoeist who competed in the 1970s and 1980s. She is from Portland, Oregon.

She won a gold medal in the K-1 team event at the 1979 ICF Canoe Slalom World Championships in Jonquière.

References

Overview of athlete's results at canoeslalom.net

American female canoeists
Possibly living people
Year of birth missing (living people)
Medalists at the ICF Canoe Slalom World Championships